Hartnell (foaled 19 April 2011) is a retired British bred thoroughbred racehorse that won four Group 1 races in Australia.

Hartnell is well known for his rivalry with champion horse Winx.  The pair faced each other seven times with Hartnell finishing runner up on three occasions.

Racing career

Foaled at Rutland Stud, on the outskirts of Newmarket, Hartnell began his racing career with Mark Johnston.  After winning the Queen's Vase he was shipped to Australia to continue racing.

In Australia, Hartnell won four Group 1 races, The BMW (2015), Turnbull Stakes (2016), C F Orr Stakes (2018) and the Epsom Handicap (2018).

Hartnell was retired from racing after finishing third in the 2019 Mackinnon Stakes. He  will join Godolphin's Lifetime Care program to be retrained, most likely as a show horse.

Hartnell made his equestrian debut in 2021 and was successful in the Rising Star Thoroughbred Class event.  His new owner Sheralee Patterson was surprised by his victory stating, “It was his first day out pretty much. What he's done today has blown me away, I can't believe how relaxed he is.  To go out in his first class in such a big arena with so many horses and then to go on and win it was just...I was lost for words.”

Pedigree

References

Racehorses bred in the United Kingdom
2011 racehorse births